Tyler Pierce is an American actor. Pierce has acted in plays on and off Broadway, including a starring role in the play Fat Pig written by Neil LaBute. He has also acted abroad in Dublin, Ireland and England. Pierce has appeared in independent films and soap operas. One of Pierce's recent roles was a part on NBC's Kidnapped, as well as a lead role in a play adaptation of Dracula.

External links
 
 Washington Post

Year of birth missing (living people)
Living people
American male film actors
American male stage actors
American male television actors
Male actors from Colorado
American expatriate male actors in the United Kingdom